Chelmsford Valley District Composite School (CVDCS) is a high school located in the community of Chelmsford, Ontario, part of Greater Sudbury. The school opened in 1953. CVDCS offers a Bilingual Trades program as its magnet program.  The school also offers the French Immersion program.

The school is overseen by the Rainbow District School Board.

See also
List of high schools in Ontario

External links
Chelmsford Valley District Composite School
Chelmsford Valley District Composite School at Rainbow District School Board

High schools in Greater Sudbury
1953 establishments in Ontario
Educational institutions established in 1953